Sir Kenneth Jacobs (1917–2015) was an Australian judge and Justice of the High Court of Australia

Kenneth Jacobs may refer to:

Kenneth M. Jacobs, chairman and CEO of Lazard Ltd
Ken Jacobs (born 1933), American filmmaker
Kenneth Jacobs (politician) (born 1959), member of the National Assembly of South Africa since 2019